Civil Service Strollers Football Club are a senior non-league football team from Edinburgh, Scotland currently playing in the . The Strollers play their home games at Christie Gillies Park. Their home strip colours are red, with white shorts and red socks.

The team is currently managed by Gary Jardine.

History 
Founded in 1908 under the name Edinburgh Civil Service Football Club, their first ground was the Stenhouse Stadium, which later became a venue for greyhound racing, before moving to Pinkhill Stadium in the 1920s. They moved to the Edinburgh Area Civil Service Sports Association in Muirhouse in 1957, where they continue to play their home games, the ground is commonly known as Christie Gillies Park.

In 2000–01, the club entered into a partnership with Talloaks to develop youth football, with the Talloaks youth teams taking on the name 'CS Strollers'. At the start of the 2001–02 season, the partnership was extended to cover all other ages of organised football. 2001–02 saw the Strollers having, for the first time, a fully incorporated women's team.

Ahead of the 2016–17 season, they were elected to fill one of two vacancies in the Lowland Football League.

Their former management team was Alex Cunningham and Ricky Clapperton until Gary Jardine took over for the 2018–19 season.

Ground 

Strollers play their home games at Christie Gillies Park, which is located just off Marine Drive in Muirhouse, Edinburgh. The ground has one small stand along the North side with the dugouts on the South side. The ground has a capacity of 1,596 with around 100 of that being seated. The pitch was once part of a large playing field but work was carried out in 2015 to provide cover for spectators and enclose the ground. Floodlights were added in 2019 to meet SFA licensing criteria.

Current squad

Season-by-season record

Lowland League

† Season curtailed due to coronavirus pandemic.

Honours
East of Scotland Football League 
 Winners: 1972–73
 Runners-up (3): 1980–81, 1988–89, 1989–90
East of Scotland Football League First Division
 Winners: 1992–93
 Runners-up (3): 1996–97, 2002–03, 2008–09
SFA South Region Challenge Cup
 Winners: 2017–18
East of Scotland Qualifying Cup
Winners (3): 1920–21; 1978–79; 1988–89
King Cup 
Winners (4): 1921–22; 1925–26; 1927–28; 1990–91
East of Scotland Consolation Cup: 1920–21
Scottish Amateur Cup: 1910–11; 1920–21
East of Scotland League Cup: 2000–01
East of Scotland Trophy: 2001–02

References

External links
 Club Website
 Facebook
 Twitter

Association football clubs established in 1908
Football clubs in Scotland
Football clubs in Edinburgh
1908 establishments in Scotland
Lowland Football League teams
East of Scotland Football League teams
Financial services association football clubs in Scotland